In both the Invierno (winter) and Verano (summer) of the 2007-08 season, there are 2 groups of 6 teams. They will play twice (home and away) with the teams of their own group (10 games).  They will also play once with the teams of the other group (6 games), for a total of 16 games. The 3 top teams of each group qualify for the playoffs. The winners of group A and B get a bye week, while the 2nd of group A plays the 3rd of group B and the 2nd of group B plays the 3rd of group A. The winners of these series move to the semi-final series.

The home field advantage in the playoffs is given to the team with the best record in the group stage.

The winner of the playoff series played between the Invierno and Verano champion will gain entry into the group stage of the 2008–09 CONCACAF Champions League. The playoff runner-up will gain entry into the 2008-09 CONCACAF Champions League preliminary round. If the same team wins both the Invierno and Verano tournaments then the preliminary round spot will be awarded to the team with the next best regular season record in the Verano tournament.

Invierno 2007

Group stage

Playoffs

Verano 2008

Group stage

Note: Saprissa and Alajuelense switched groups at the end of Apertura 2007.

Playoffs

Aggregate table

Saprissa earned CRC1 spot in 2008–09 CONCACAF Champions League.
Alajuelense earned CRC2 spot in 2008–09 CONCACAF Champions League.

References

External links
http://www.unafut.com/?s=posiciones

 

Liga FPD seasons
1
Costa